The following is the official canvassing of votes by the Batasang Pambansa for the 1986 Philippine presidential election. The canvassing started on February 10, 1986 and ended on February 15, 1986.

Members of the board of tellers

Members

Alternates

Presidential election

Vice presidential election

References 

1986 in the Philippines